David de Sousa Nascimento (born 16 March 1966), or simply Nascimento, is a Cape Verdean professional football coach and former player who is the head coach of the Jordan women's national team.

Born in São Vicente, Cape Verde, he is the first Cape Verdean that has a UEFA Pro License. He has had a long career as a professional player in both Portugal and the Netherlands, having played over 500 matches. Afterwards, he also worked in various managerial positions in the Netherlands, Mexico and South Africa.

Playing career 
Nascimento started his career in Portugal. He turned professional at the age of 17 representing Vitória de Setúbal and Vitória de Guimarães a few years later. In the 1991–92 season, he decided to join Dutch Eredivisie club RKC. He stayed there one season, before moving on to Roda JC, during which period he was called up for the Portugal national team. In 1994, he moved to Utrecht, where he played four seasons and grew into a key player. In the 1998–99 season – after Nascimento lost his place in the Utrecht starting line-up under head coach Mark Wotte – manager Martin Jol facilitated his return to RKC, where he was made team captain. Three seasons later, he signed with RBC Roosendaal where he would stay for one season before joining Sparta Rotterdam. There, he decided to retire from professional football player at the age of 38 having played over 500 official matches.

Managerial career 
Having ended his career as professional player, Nascimento started in season 2004–05 as coach of Sparta Rotterdam U15 team. With this team he won the Nike Tournament and therefore qualified to compete against other European Tournament winners such as Sporting CP, Manchester United and Juventus. At the end of this season, Nascimento and Adri van Tiggelen took over from Sparta first-team coach Mike Snoei and were asked to lead Sparta to promotion to the Eredivisie. Sparta won all their play-off matches resulting in a promotion to the highest level. The next season, Nascimento was an understudy to coach Louis van Gaal at AZ. In the 2006–07 season, Nascimento became coach of the FC Utrecht U18 team, which finished in second place in the national competition for under-18 teams. Also he was appointed first-team assistant by manager Foeke Booy, a position in which he stayed until the end of 2008. In 2009, Nascimento received the highest coaching diploma, the UEFA Pro License.

On 22 October 2010, Nascimento was appointed new head coach of fourth-tier Topklasse club Sparta Nijkerk, succeeding the dismissed Raymond Schuurman. In the 2011–12 season, he became head of youth development for South African club Mamelodi Sundowns. From June 2012 to February 2013, Nascimento was assistant to John van 't Schip at Mexican club Guadalajara. He shortly coached the Malta national under-19 team during the 2016 UEFA European Under-19 Championship qualification.

On 22 January 2018, Nascimento was appointed head coach of FC Eindhoven as successor to Wilfred van Leeuwen. He signed a contract until the end of the 2017–18 season with an option to extend. He was succeeded by Ernie Brandts in July 2019.

In October 2021, Nascimento was appointed head coach of the Jordan women's national team.

Executive career 
On 7 May 2014, Cypriot side APOEL appointed Nascimento as the club's new technical director. On 27 August 2014, his contract with APOEL was terminated by mutual consent.

References

1966 births
Living people
People from São Vicente, Cape Verde
Cape Verdean footballers
Cape Verdean football managers
Cape Verdean expatriate footballers
Portuguese footballers
Portuguese expatriate footballers
Portuguese football managers
Amora F.C. players
Vitória F.C. players
F.C. Barreirense players
Vitória S.C. players
Sport Benfica e Castelo Branco players
RKC Waalwijk players
Roda JC Kerkrade players
FC Utrecht players
RBC Roosendaal players
Sparta Rotterdam players
Segunda Divisão players
Eredivisie players
Expatriate footballers in the Netherlands
Portuguese expatriate sportspeople in the Netherlands
Cape Verdean expatriate sportspeople in the Netherlands
Cape Verdean expatriate sportspeople in Cyprus
Sparta Rotterdam non-playing staff
AZ Alkmaar non-playing staff
FC Utrecht non-playing staff
C.D. Guadalajara non-playing staff
FC Eindhoven managers
Association football defenders
Sparta Nijkerk managers
Women's national association football team managers
Jordan women's national football team managers
Portuguese expatriate football managers
Cape Verdean expatriate football managers
Portuguese expatriate sportspeople in Jordan
Cape Verdean expatriate sportspeople in Jordan
Expatriate football managers in Jordan